Elizaveta Ryzih (born 27 September 1988 in Omsk, Soviet Union) is a German pole vault athlete. Two times an Olympian, she was 6th in London and 10th in Rio Olympic games. She was described by one athletics commentator as a "tall, fast and athletic" pole vaulter, and she has seen good success in European Championships as well as being a constant presence in the world yearly rankings of pole vaulters, placing among the top 10 vaulters in recent years.

She is the younger sister of fellow pole vaulter Anastasija Reiberger (Nastja Ryjikh). She is coached by her father Vladimir Ryzih.

Biography 
She won at the 2003 World Youth Championships in Athletics and then set a personal best of 4.30 m for gold at the 2004 World Junior Championships in Athletics at the age of 15. She attempted to be the first athlete to win consecutive titles at the 2005 World Youth Championships, but she managed only 4.05 m for fifth place. Ryzih was the favourite to retain her title at the 2006 World Junior Championships in Athletics but failed to clear the opening height in the final after three attempts.

Ryzih was fourth at the 2007 European Athletics Junior Championships and also won gold at the 2009 European Under-23 Athletics Championships in the women's pole vault in Kaunas. On 30 July 2010, she recorded a personal best of 4.65 m at the 2010 European Athletics Championships in Barcelona. This gained her the bronze medal, the first international medal of her senior career.

She competed at the 2012 Summer Olympics, finishing in joint 6th with a jump of 4.45 m. The following year, she finished in 8th at the World Championships, with a jump of 4.55 m. The following year, she missed out on a European level medal by countback, jumping the same height (4.60 m) as both the silver and bronze medalists at the 2014 European Championships.  She reached the final, but finished last, at the 2015 World Championships. At the 2016 European Championships, she won a silver with a season's best jump of 4.70 m. Later, in August, she reached another Olympic final at Rio 2016.

In Feb. 2017 Lisa Ryzih competed in German Indoor Championships in Leipzig where she got the first place with a jump of 4.65m, with the silver and bronze medals going to 4.40 and 4.30m, respectively. She participated in 2017 Belgrade European's Indoor Athletics meet in 4 March as a top contender and finished second place and getting silver medal with a jump of 4.75m, setting a new indoor personal best.

The IAAF profile of Lisa Ryzih including her personal best records can be found here.

German Championships 
Lisa Ryzih has won 6 titles and some medals in German Athletics Championships (DM) in Pole Vault.

For outdoor, these include: 1st place in 2017 (Erfurt) with jump of 4.70 m; 2nd place in 2016 (Kassel) with jump of 4.65 m; 1st place in 2015 (Nuremberg) with jump of 4.60 m; 1st place in 2014 (Ulm) with a jump of 4.50 m; 2nd place in 2012 with a jump of 4.65 m; 2nd place in 2010 with a jump of 4.60 m; 3rd place in 2009 with a jump of 4.40 m.

For indoor, she was 1st place in 2017 (Leipzig) with a jump of 4.65 m. She also won the indoor title in 2015 in Karlsruhe with 4.55 m and won the 2011 title in Leipzig with a jump of 4.65 m.

In 2018 indoor national championships, Lisa finished in second place with a jump of 4.46m. She is now preparing herself in a training camp in Spain for the European Championships in Berlin (2018) to be held in the Summer. She announced later that she is skipping the 2018 outdoor season including the European Championships for recovery.

2019 
After healing her partial Achilles tear, Lisa returned to competition in the Karlsruhe meeting of the 2019 IAAF World Indoor Tour by recording a jump of 4.63 m.

Competition record

1No mark in the final
2Did not start in the final

See also 
 Athletics at the 2012 Summer Olympics – Women's pole vault
 Athletics at the 2016 Summer Olympics – Women's pole vault
 Germany all-time top lists – Pole vault

References

External links 

  
 
 
 
 
 
 

1988 births
Living people
Sportspeople from Omsk
German female pole vaulters
Olympic female pole vaulters
Olympic athletes of Germany
Athletes (track and field) at the 2012 Summer Olympics
Athletes (track and field) at the 2016 Summer Olympics
European Athletics Championships medalists
World Athletics Championships athletes for Germany
World Youth Championships in Athletics winners
German national athletics champions
Russian emigrants to Germany